Amba is a 1990 Indian Bollywood film produced and directed by Mohan Kumar. It stars Anil Kapoor, Meenakshi Seshadri, Kiran Juneja, and Shabana Azmi in the title role as Amba.

Plot
Prabha lives a wealthy lifestyle with her widowed father Thakur Jasbir Singh and her brother Kunwar Ranvir. She receives a marriage proposal from equally wealthy Thakur Shamsher Singh but immediately rejects him and marries Rajendra. Prabha re-locates to move in with him and his widowed and principled mother, Amba Bhanupratap Singh, and his wayward brother, Suraj. Prabha soon gives birth to Rajat. Rajendra, who secretly visits local courtesan, Munnibai, returns home intoxicated one night and sexually molests and then kills Geeta, who is their servant, Bhiku's daughter, but is treated like a family member. Then, when Amba returns home after watching Ram Leela, she apprehends Rajendra, has him arrested, he is eventually tried in Court, found guilty after Amba's testimony, and hanged. A devastated and humiliated Prabha swears to avenge his death, and leaves to live with her equally vengeful dad and brother, and together they plot to turn Amba and Suraj's lives upside down - so much so that Amba and Suraj not only lose their ancestral estate, their house is burned down, they are blacklisted by the community, where Amba is the Sarpanch, and to top it all up, Suraj is arrested for killing Shamsher and sexually molesting Prabha, and if found guilty will also be hanged like his brother.

Cast

 Shabana Azmi as Amba Bhanupratap Singh, mother of Suraj
 Anil Kapoor as Suraj "Sarju" B. Singh
 Meenakshi Seshadri as Lajjo
 Kanwaljit Singh as Rajendra 'Raja' B. Singh 
 Kiran Juneja as Prabha R. Singh
 Rajan Sippy as Kunwar Ranvir J. Singh, Brother of Prabha
 Mangal Dhillon as Thakur Shamsher Singh
Sudhir Pandey as Thakur Jasbir Singh, Father of Prabha
Sujit Kumar as Bhiku, servant
Satish Shah as Neelkanth
Yunus Parvez as Banne Miya
Upasana Singh as Munnibai
Shivraj as Gurghand
Dulari as Naanima
Ram Mohan as Judge
Jaya Mathur as Geeta Yadav
Birbal as Amba's supporter
Kamaldeep as Police Inspector

Soundtrack
Anand Bakshi penned the lyrics. The soundtrack includes the following songs:

Reception
Bob Chinn of Cult Movies magazine wrote in 2003, "While this is obviously a star vehicle for Azmi, one must remember that there are stars and there are actresses. Shabana Azmi is that rare combination of both." Sukanya Verma of Rediff.com, however, criticised Azmi's choice of the part as "strange" and further writing, "The film shamelessly tries to fit in the Mother India mould dumbing down Azmi’s fiery brilliance to a cringe-worthy stereotype that’s as bearable as the tacky silver wig on her head".

References

External links

1990s Hindi-language films
1990 films
Films scored by Laxmikant–Pyarelal
Films directed by Mohan Kumar